Betoi (Betoy) or Betoi-Jirara is an extinct language of Colombia and Venezuela, south of the Apure River near the modern border with Colombia. The names Betoi and Jirara are those of two of its peoples/dialects; the language proper has no known name. At contact, Betoi was a local lingua franca spoken between the Uribante and Sarare rivers and along the Arauca. Enough was recorded for a brief grammatical monograph to be written (Zamponi 2003).

Classification
Betoi is generally seen as an isolate, though Kaufman (2007) included it in Macro-Paesan.

Zamponi (2017) finds enough lexical resemblances between Betoi and the Saliban languages to conclude that a genealogical relationship is plausible.

Varieties
Below is a full list of Betoi varieties listed by Loukotka (1968), including names of unattested varieties.

Betoi / Guanero / Isabaco - extinct language once spoken on the Casanare River, Cravo Norte River, and Apure River, Arauca territory, Colombia.
Situfa / Cituja - extinct language once spoken on the Casanare River in the Arauca region.
Airico - once spoken at the sources of the Manacacías River. (Gumilla 1745, pt. 2, pp. 243-247, only a few words.)
Jirara - spoken once in the upper Manacacías River region. (Gumilla 1745, pt. 1, pp. 201 and 203, pt. 2, pp. 16 and 328, only a few words and phrases.)
Atabaca - once spoken in the upper Manacacías River region. (Gumilla 1745, pt. 2, p. 274, only a few words.)
Lolaca - once spoken on the confluence of the Arauca River and Chitagá River. (Unattested.)
Quilifay - once spoken around the confluence of the Arauca River and Chitagá River. (Unattested.)
Anabali - spoken south of the Atabaca tribe around the confluence of the Arauca River and Chitagá River. (Unattested.)
Ele - spoken on the Ele River. (Unattested.)

Lexicon
Lexicon of Betoi compiled by Zamponi (2003) from various sources:

Nouns

Verbs

Adverbs

Pronouns

Other parts of speech

References

Bibliography

Language isolates of South America
Extinct languages of South America
Languages extinct in the 18th century
Languages of Venezuela
Macro-Paesan languages